Gino M. Santos (born November 12, 1989) is a Filipino film director and producer. They also teach at CIIT College of Arts and Technology.

Education

Gino Santos graduated with a digital filmmaking degree from De La Salle-College of Saint Benilde in 2012. To further hone his craft, he enrolled in filmmaking workshops at Asia Pacific Film Institute, The Marilou Diaz-Abaya film institute, and The New York Film Academy Filmmaking workshop in Kyoto, Japan.

Career

He has directed numerous short films that have garnered attention not just locally, but also internationally, in film festivals held in Berlin and Los Angeles. He is a two-time recipient of the Honorable Mention award from Gawad CCP for his short films "Ang Tangke" (The Water Tank) and an experimental film "Bangungot" (Sleep Paralysis). His college thesis, "Labing Dalawa" (Twelve) received a Best Short Film nomination at the 35th Gawad Urian Awards.

"Every Other Time" was his short film entry to the 7th Cinemalaya Philippine Independent Film Festival. He directed his first full-length feature – The Animals – a year later, which premiered at the same festival.

The Animals received the Best in Editing award at Cinemalaya, and continued on receiving wide recognition, such as Best Screenplay, Best Cinematography, and Best Musical Score at the 36th Gawad Urian Awards, as well as international premieres in Stockholm International Film Festival and New York Asian Film Festival.

He co-directed his second full-length feature, entitled Island Dreams, with director and screenwriter Aloy Adlawan. The film was an entry to the Metro Manila Film Festival – New Wave Category, and received the Most Gender Sensitive award.

#Y, his third full-length feature premiered at the 10th Cinemalaya Philippine Independent Film Festival in August 2014.

Gino currently directs The Tim Yap Show with Tim Yap on the GMA Network.

Filmography

Film

Short Film

Television

References

External links 
 

1989 births
Living people
Filipino film directors
De La Salle–College of Saint Benilde alumni